Big Thinkers is a former ZDTV (later TechTV) television program. It featured a half-hour interview with a "big thinker" in science, technology, and other fields. The show was originally hosted by Mark Eddo, later replaced by John C. Dvorak. In 2001 the show changed its format, transforming from a weekly half-hour interview to a documentary-style program. This new format was initially referred to on the TechTV website as Big Thinkers 2.0.

The new incarnation of the Big Thinkers series was produced by Winton / duPont Films, a documentary film company located in the Presidio of San Francisco. Interviews were filmed in a 16:9 format and intercut with public domain material from the Prelinger Archives. This archival footage (mostly film clips from the 1940s and 1950s) was used to create visual metaphors highlighting the speaker's points.

Individuals featured on Big Thinkers 2.0
 Scott Adams - cartoonist
 Douglas Adams - author
 Ralph Merkle - nanotechnology researcher
 Jaron Lanier - virtual reality pioneer
 Ian Wilmut - embryologist
 David Gelernter - professor of computer science	
 Stewart Brand - founder of the Long Now Foundation
 Lawrence Lessig - law professor
 Neil Spiller - architect
 Sherry Turkle - psychologist
 James Lovelock - independent scientist
 Robert Langer - biotechnology researcher
 Rodney Brooks - robotics researcher
 Jack Horner - paleontologist
 Daniel Dennett - philosopher
 Michio Kaku - theoretical physicist
 Alvin Toffler - futurist
 Tom Kelley - General Manager of IDEO
 Steve Jones - biologist
 Tod Machover - musician
 Dean Kamen - inventor
 Michael Powell - politician (former FCC Chairman)
 Penn Fraser Jillette - entertainer

External links 
 

American television talk shows
1990s American documentary television series
2000s American documentary television series
1999 American television series debuts
2002 American television series endings
TechTV original programming